Banihal railway station (station code: BAHL), a part of Jammu–Baramulla line, is situated in notified area of Banihal in Ramban district, Jammu and Kashmir. It was commissioned on 26 June 2013 and passenger trains run from Banihal to Qazigund. The station was inaugurated by former prime minister Manmohan Singh and UPA Chairperson Sonia Gandhi on the same day at 2.22 pm. They enjoyed the 12-minute ride in train through Pir Panjal tunnel up to Qazigund with 100 students, mostly girls, of the Banihal Higher Secondary School, and made the 17.8-km ride back to Banihal, passing through the tunnel again, the second longest in Asia.

Background
The station has been built as part of the Jammu–Baramulla line megaproject, intending to link the Kashmir Valley with Jammu Tawi and the rest of the Indian railway network.

Services
The railway network in Kashmir from Banihal to Baramulla is now 137 km. Five trains run daily from Banihal to Baramulla. The services were paused for a prolonged period since 5 August 2019 after the Abrogation of Article 35A and at that period it were resumed only once for a special documentary shoot. However later the services were introduced from January 2020 onwards.

Design
Like all the other stations in this megaproject, this station also features Kashmiri wood architecture, with an intended ambience of a royal court which is designed to complement the local surroundings to the station. Station signage is predominantly in Urdu, English and Hindi.

See also
 Srinagar railway station
 Udhampur railway station
 Anantnag railway station
 Shri Mata Vaishno Devi Katra railway station

References

Railway stations in Ramban district
Railway stations opened in 2013
Firozpur railway division